The Wilderness 40 is an American sailboat, that was designed by Gary Mull and first built in 1980.

The Wilderness 40 is a development of the 1979 Wilderness 38.

Production
The boat was built by Wilderness Yachts in Santa Cruz, California, United States, who built at least five examples, although the design is now out of production.

Design
The Wilderness 40 is a small recreational keelboat, built predominantly of fiberglass, with wood trim. It has a masthead sloop rig, an internally-mounted spade-type rudder and a fixed fin keel. It displaces  and carries  of lead ballast.

The boat is fitted with a Japanese Yanmar diesel engine.

Variants
Wilderness 40 serial numbers 1 to 4
PHRF racing average handicap of 87 with a high of 87 and low of 87.
Wilderness 40 serial numbers 5 and on
PHRF racing average handicap of 81. It has a hull speed of

See also
List of sailing boat types

References

Keelboats
1980s sailboat type designs
Sailing yachts
Sailboat type designs by Gary Mull
Sailboat types built by Wilderness Yachts